Béla Illés (born 27 April 1968 in Sárvár, Hungary) is a retired Hungarian football player who has spent most of his career playing for MTK Hungária FC.  He is considered to be the greatest Hungarian footballer of the 1990s.

He was only 19 when Haladás VSE made a move for him during the 1986–1987 season and he made his debut to the NB1 against Tatabánya on 19 October 1986.

He is currently the chairman and part-owner of Szombathelyi Haladás VSE.

Honours

Club

Budapest Honvéd
 Hungarian League: 1993

MTK Hungária FC
 Hungarian League: 1997, 1999, 2003
 Runner-up: 2000
 Hungarian Cup: 1997, 1998, 2000
 Hungarian Super Cup: 2003

Personal honours
 Top Goalscorer: 1994; 1997; 1999
 Player of the Year in Hungary: 1994; 1997; 1998

International goals

References

1968 births
Living people
Hungarian footballers
Hungary international footballers
Budapest Honvéd FC players
MTK Budapest FC players
Nemzeti Bajnokság I players
Association football midfielders